The canton of Bagnols-sur-Cèze is an administrative division of the Gard department, southern France. Its borders were modified at the French canton reorganisation which came into effect in March 2015. Its seat is in Bagnols-sur-Cèze.

It consists of the following communes:
 
Bagnols-sur-Cèze
Cavillargues
Chusclan
Connaux
Gaujac
Orsan
Le Pin
Sabran
Saint-Étienne-des-Sorts
Saint-Pons-la-Calm
Tresques

References

Cantons of Gard